This is a list of the busiest airports in Kazakhstan

At a glance

Kazakhstan's busiest airports by passenger traffic in 2019

Kazakhstan's busiest airports by passenger traffic in 2018

Kazakhstan's busiest airports by passenger traffic in 2017

Kazakhstan's busiest airports by passenger traffic in 2016

Kazakhstan's busiest airports by passenger traffic in 2015

Kazakhstan's busiest airports by passenger traffic in 2014

Kazakhstan's busiest airports by passenger traffic in 2013

Kazakhstan's busiest airports by passenger traffic in 2012

See also
 List of the busiest airports in Asia
 List of the busiest airports in Europe
 List of the busiest airports in the former USSR

References

Kazakhstan
Airports, busiest
Airports, busiest